Lennington "Len" Small (June 16, 1862 – May 17, 1936) was an American politician who served as the 26th Governor of Illinois from 1921 to 1929. He previously was a member of the Illinois state senate from the 16th District from 1901 to 1903 and was Illinois state treasurer, from 1905 to 1907, and from 1917 to 1919. He is known for accusations of embezzlement brought against him.

Early life
Small was born in Kankakee County, Illinois, and attended public education at Northern Indiana Normal School, now Valparaiso University, through his senior year. After schooling, became a teacher, and invested in real estate, eventually owning a farm, a bank, and Kankakee's daily newspaper. 
In 1883, Small married Ida Moore, and they had three children together.  Six months after the Governor's inauguration, on June 26, 1922, Ida Moore Small died suddenly from apoplexy (the term at the time for a stroke) at the age of 60 while Small and his wife were being welcomed home following his acquittal on charges of embezzlement.

Political career
Small's political career began in 1896 when he was elected Clerk of the Kankakee County Circuit Court. In 1900, Small was elected to the Illinois Senate from the 20th district. 
He served in the Illinois Senate from 1901 to 1905. The 20th district included Grundy, Iroquois, and Kankakee counties. Small was the Illinois Treasurer from 1905 to 1907, and again from 1917 to 1919. He served as the assistant U.S. Treasurer in charge of the sub treasury at Chicago from 1908 to 1912, and was a delegate to Republican National Convention from Illinois  in 1908, 1912, and 1932.

Small was elected governor of Illinois in 1920 and was reelected in in 1924. He was indicted, six months after becoming governor, for embezzling over a million dollars in a money-laundering scheme in which he placed state funds into a fake bank while he was state treasurer. He was acquitted, but eight jurors later got state jobs, raising suspicions of jury tampering.

As governor, Small pardoned 20 members of the Communist Labor Party of America, convicted under the Illinois Sedition Act. He also pardoned or paroled over 1000 convicted felons, including Harry Guzik, brother of the Chicago Outfit's Jake Guzik, of Posen, Illinois, who was convicted of kidnapping young girls and forcing them into lives of prostitution (then commonly called white slavery).

In 1923, bootlegger Edward "Spike" O'Donnell of Southside Chicago was released from prison by Small. O'Donnell returned to Chicago as the leader of one of the most powerful bootlegging gangs in the city.

Small's reputation for corruption finally caught up with him at the ballot box when he was defeated in the 1928 Republican "Pineapple Primary" by a margin of 63% to 37% against Louis Lincoln Emmerson, the incumbent Illinois Secretary of State. Small made a failed run for governor in 1932, and another in 1936.

Death
Small died on May 17, 1936. He is buried at Mound Grove Cemetery in Kankakee, Illinois.

References

Further reading
Kobler, John. Capone. Da Capo Press of Perseus Books Group, New York. 2003. p. 79. 
Ridings, Jim. Len Small: Governors and Gangsters. Side Show Books, Herscher IL. 2009.

External links
 National Governors Association
 The Political Graveyard
 Genealogy Trails
 Illinois State Archives

1862 births
1936 deaths
Republican Party governors of Illinois
Republican Party Illinois state senators
People from Kankakee, Illinois
Valparaiso University alumni
State treasurers of Illinois
Illinois politicians convicted of corruption